The Fiat 1100 is a small family car produced from 1937 to 1953 by the Italian car manufacturer Fiat. It was introduced in 1937 as Fiat 508 C or Balilla 1100, as a replacement for the Fiat 508 Balilla. Under the new body the 508 C had more modern and refined mechanicals compared to the 508, including independent front suspension and an enlarged overhead valve engine.
In 1939 it was updated and renamed simply Fiat 1100. The 1100 was produced in three consecutive series—1100, 1100 B and 1100 E—until 1953, when it was replaced by the all-new, unibody Fiat 1100/103.

History

The Fiat 508 C was first introduced in 1937. It was powered by a 1,089 cc four-cylinder overhead-valve engine rather than the earlier Balilla's 1-litre unit.
Drive was to the rear wheels through a 4-speed gearbox, and for the period, its comfort, handling, and performance were prodigious, making it "the only people's car that was also a driver's car". Unusual for a modestly priced car of the time was the independent front suspension, while the rear had a leaf sprung live axle.

Exterior styling recalled the 1935 Fiat 1500 and the 1936 Fiat 500 "Topolino", with the typical mid-thirties heart-shaped front grille.
The main body style for the Fiat 508 C was a 4-door pillarless saloon with 4 side windows (two windows on each side without the rear quarter window), and suicide doors at the rear. Other body styles listed by Fiat were a 4-door convertible saloon (saloon with folding roof, based on the standard 4-door model), a 4-door torpedo, a 2-door 4-seat cabriolet, and, for a brief period, a sporty 2-door 2-seat spider built by Carrozzeria Viotti.

The 508 L was sold as a 4-door, 6-window saloon, pillarless and with rear-hinged aft doors like the 508 C, able to carry six passenger thanks to two foldaway seats. Additionally there was a 4-door, 6-window taxi (Tassì) version, which differed in possessing a B-pillar—to which all four doors were hinged—and a partition between the driver and passenger compartments. Indeed, most 508 L saloons saw service as taxis or livery cars. The lengthened 508 L also formed the base for two light commercial vehicles, a van (Italian name 508 L Furgoncino) and a platform lorry (508 L Camioncino).

Again in 1938 a sports model was introduced, the  508 C Mille Miglia.

In 1939 the car underwent a restyling of the front end and became the Fiat 1100, also inappropriately known as 1100 A to distinguish from the later variants. The car had gained a taller, pointed grille—which earned it the popular nickname of 1100 musone, i. e. "big muzzle"—with horizontal chrome bars, the top three extending back over window-shaped louvres on each side of the redesigned engine bonnet. Available body styles were six, all carried over from the previous model: saloon, convertible saloon, cabriolet, sports berlinetta, long-wheelbase saloon and taxi. No significant changes were made to the car's mechanicals.

After World War II, in 1948, the 1100 received some mechanical and interior upgrades, and was renamed 1100 B. The revised type 1100 B engine produced  at 4,400 rpm thanks to improved inlet and exhaust manifolds and a larger 32 mm diameter choke carburettor. Inside the cabin there was a two-spoke steering wheel instead of the previous three-spoke one, new instrumentation and new trim. The 1100 B was available as saloon, long-wheelbase saloon and taxi. In total 25,000 were made between 1948 and 1949. 

The 1100 B lasted only one year as in 1949 the car was re-introduced with a curvy boot and new name, the 1100 E.

Derivatives

508 C Mille Miglia

The Fiat 508 C Mille Miglia was a 2-door, 2-seat berlinetta sports car based on the 508 C chassis and engine, produced in 1938 and 1939.

The novel coupé body had a peculiar but highly aerodynamic shape, characterised by a flat, elongated roofline, an abruptly cut off tail, and some very modern traits like an uninterrupted fender line and smooth sides—a first on a Fiat.
As the Mille Miglia model was developed mainly to help promote the new 508 C by competing in motor racing, the chassis had to be carried over from the saloon and couldn't be lowered or altered to reduce the frontal area. Therefore in order to up the car's top speed Fiat's Ufficio tecnico vetture (motor car engineering and design department, headed by Dante Giacosa) had to optimise the body shape to lower its drag coefficient—even at the cost of sacrificing interior room and rear visibility.
According to Giacosa inspiration for the sports coupé's body came from observing that during test runs a prototype 500 Topolino-based van could reach a higher top speed than the saloon it was based on. The shape of the body was then perfected using a number of 1:5 scale models and the wind tunnel of the Politecnico di Torino university.

The 1,089 cc engine had a larger Zenith 32 VIMB carburettor, a 7:1 compression ratio and other improvements; now coded 108 C M.M., it produced  at 4,400 rpm—up from 32 PS of the standard 508 C.

For 1939 the body shape was further developed, changing the front end (now with a trilobate instead of hearth-shaped grille) and exaggerating the teardrop shape of the rear.

References

Notes

Bibliography

External links

Gallery on Italian Balilla registry website 

1100 (1937)
1930s cars
1940s cars
1950s cars
Cars introduced in 1937
Compact cars
Sedans
Convertibles
Roadsters